Akal Ustat (pronunciation: , lit. ‘the praise of the Timeless One’) is the name given to the second Bani in the second holy scriptures of the Sikhs called the Dasam Granth. It is composed of 271 verses, and is largely devotional in nature.

The word "Akal" mean the "timeless primal being" and the word "Ustat" (from the Sanskrit word 'stuti') means "praise". So together, the words "Akal Ustat" mean "the praise of the Timeless One". In it, Guru Gobind Singh, the tenth Sikh Guru writes that God is worshipped by various peoples in many different ways, and with varying names and methods:

The scripture is notable for its unalloyed disavowal of the caste system, and of cultural elitism in general. At various points in this composition, Guru Gobind Singh speaks out against the belief that some people are superior to others, by virtue of belonging to a particular religion, region, history, culture, colour or creed. Instead, he clearly and firmly states that "all human beings are equal ":

Gallery

References

Bibliography 

 The Wondrous Play, Dr. Jodh Singh.
 The Life and Ideals of Guru Gobind Singh by Surindar Singh Kohli, 1986, Munshiram Manoharlal

Sikh scripture
Dasam Granth